Gutworm were a British extreme metal band from Wellingborough, Northamptonshire, England, formed in 1999.

Band history

Gutworm recorded their debut EP at Backstage Studios, Nottingham, with hardcore producer Dave Chang. This release, titled Torn From Me, was released early in 2000. Metal Hammer awarded it 9/10, writing "I can’t believe this band are British and unsigned!"

After several tours across the country Gutworm ventured to the USA and became the first unsigned British band to perform at the November To Dismember Metalfest in California. The band played alongside acts such as Morbid Angel and Testament and returned soon after to play at the New Jersey Metal Meltdown, which featured bands such as Nile and The Haunted.

The band soon signed to European label SPV GmbH and recorded twelve songs at Karo Studios in Germany during March 2001. Following lengthy delays, which saw the album release date being pushed further and further back, Gutworm parted company with the label.

After a break, Gutworm resumed touring the country, attracting the attention of new British label Anticulture Records, which signed the band in 2003. They went on to record an album featuring new material with Greg Chandler (of Esoteric) at Priory Studios in Birmingham.

Gutworm’s full-length album Ruin The Memory was released nationwide in June 2004. Since the album’s release Gutworm have been busier than ever. After a performance at the Bloodstock Indoor 2004 festival, which received 4Ks in Kerrang! magazine, Gutworm produced their first major video for album opener What You Are which was broadcast on digital music channels Scuzz and MTV2.

Following a UK tour supporting US technical metallers Byzantine, 2005 saw the band's first line-up change with the departure of bassist Carl Davis, replaced by Liam Durrant (formerly of UK hardcore bands Freebase and Violation).  Further changes followed in 2006 after UK tours with Maltese metalcore band Slit and French deathgrinders Happy Face, with the departure of guitarist Noel Davis, and with Liam taking time out to pursue a university course.

With Neil Hudson taking on guitar and vocals, and new bassist Glen Pywell (from deathgrind/doom band The Atrocity Exhibit), Gutworm recorded their second full-length album Disfigured Narcissus, again with Greg Chandler, which was released to critical acclaim on Anticulture Records in October 2007.

The band performed their final live show in December 2009, with previous members taking to the stage once more. In 2012, members Neil Hudson, Carl Davis, Noel Davis, and Wayne Minney, made their return with the new extreme metal project Krysthla.

Band members

Members
Neil Hudson - vocals and guitar (1999–2010) - formerly of Violation.
Wayne Minney - drums (1999–2010)
Glen Pywell - bass (2006–2010) - formerly of The Atrocity Exhibit.
Mike Ranzetta - guitar (2007–2010) - also of Lordaeron.

Former members
Lee Mason - guitar (1999–2007)
Noel Davis - guitar (1999–2006)
Carl Davis - bass (1999–2005)
Liam Durrant - bass (2005–2006) - now playing guitar for Thracia.
Jamie Hunt - live guitar (2007) - formerly of Biomechanical.

Timeline

Discography

Recordings
2000 - Torn from Me (Self-released)
2004 - Ruin the Memory (Anticulture Records)
2007 - Disfigured Narcissus (Anticulture Records)

Promotional videos
2001 - 'Your Demise' (featured on Metal Hammer cover CD)
2004 - 'What You Are'

External links
 Gutworm Official Website
 Anticulture Records Website

British alternative metal musical groups
English heavy metal musical groups
Musical groups established in 1999
1999 establishments in England